Carrick Mountain is located in the eastern foothills of the Wicklow Mountains in Ireland. Historically it was called Carrigmurrely (1756) and Carrickmacreily (1795).

Geography 
The mountain rises directly above the village of Glenealy on the R752, midway between Rathnew and Rathdrum. The mountain is, bar a few large rocky knolls, completely covered in forest.

Access to the summit 
There is a network of forest roads on the hill, with long straights, steeps slopes, and hair-pin bends; the forest roads, with their sand and gravel surfaces, ascend to within 100 m of the summit. It is a popular location for car rallying (official and unofficial).

Rock climbing 
There are granite outcrops near the summit of Carrick, which have been established as a minor rock-climbing location. About 15 single-pitch routes have been recorded, at all grades up to E2.

See also
List of mountains in Ireland

References

Marilyns of Ireland
Mountains and hills of County Wicklow
Climbing areas of Ireland